There are only two Basilicas in the Republic of Ireland, Knock Co. Mayo, which was built for Pope John Paul II's visit to Ireland, and also for the Apparition. The other is Lough Derg in Co. Donegal, built to commemorate St. Patrick's place of penance.

References

See also

 List of cathedrals in Ireland
 List of Cathedrals
 Basilica

 
Lists of churches in the Republic of Ireland
Ireland